Power to the People and the Beats is a greatest hits album by hip hop group Public Enemy.

Album information
The collection represents the group's output during their time on Def Jam/Universal.

The planned Power to the People and the Videos release was delayed due to legal issues with Universal.

Reception

Uncut (p. 130) – 4 stars out of 5 – "PE harnessed the power of chaos and rage more effectively than any punk or speed-metal merchant, were more articulate in their anger than any folk singer, were as righteous as any roots reggae or gospel singer."

Mojo (p. 132) – 4 stars out of 5 – "[With] squealing, clashing samples..."

Track listing

CD version
"You're Gonna Get Yours" (C. Ridenhour, H. Shocklee) (from Yo! Bum Rush The Show) – 4:05
"Public Enemy No. 1" (C. Ridenhour, H. Shocklee) (from Yo! Bum Rush The Show) – 4:41
"Rebel Without a Pause" (Vocal Version) (C. Ridenhour, H. Shocklee, E. Sadler, N. Rogers) (from It Takes a Nation of Millions to Hold Us Back) – 4:18
"Bring the Noise" (C. Ridenhour, H. Shocklee, E. Sadler) (from It Takes a Nation of Millions to Hold Us Back) – 3:47
"Don't Believe the Hype" (C. Ridenhour, E. Sadler, H. Shocklee, W. Drayton) (from It Takes a Nation of Millions to Hold Us Back) – 5:19
"Prophets of Rage" (C. Ridenhour, H. Shocklee, E. Sadler) (from It Takes a Nation of Millions to Hold Us Back) – 3:20
"Black Steel in the Hour of Chaos" (Single Edit) (C. Ridenhour, H. Shocklee, E. Sadler, W. Drayton) (from It Takes a Nation of Millions to Hold Us Back) – 3:43
"Fight the Power" (K. Shocklee, E. Sadler, C. Ridenhour) (from Fear of a Black Planet) – 4:36
"Welcome to the Terrordome" (K. Shocklee, E. Sadler, C. Ridenhour) (from Fear of a Black Planet) – 5:26
"911 Is a Joke" (W. Drayton, K. Shocklee, E. Sadler) (from Fear of a Black Planet) – 3:17
"Brothers Gonna Work It Out" (K. Shocklee, E. Sadler, C. Ridenhour) (from Fear of a Black Planet) – 5:08
"Can't Do Nuttin' for Ya Man" (H. Shocklee, E. Sadler, C. Ridenhour) (from Fear of a Black Planet) – 2:47
"Can't Truss It" (C. Ridenhour, S. Robertz, Gary G-Wiz, C. Depper) (from Apocalypse 91... The Enemy Strikes Black) – 4:52
"Shut Em Down" (C. Ridenhour, S. Robertz, Gary G-Wiz, C. Depper) (from Apocalypse 91... The Enemy Strikes Black) – 4:19
"By the Time I Get to Arizona" (C. Ridenhour, S. Robertz, Gary G-Wiz, C. Depper, Mandrill, Santiago) (from Apocalypse 91... The Enemy Strikes Black) – 4:00
"Hazy Shade of Criminal" (C. Ridenhour, W. Drayton, The JBL, S. Robertz, Gary G-Wiz) (from Greatest Misses) – 4:50
"Give It Up" (Gary G-Wiz, C. Ridenhour, Studdah Man, A. Isbell, M. Thomas) (from Muse Sick-N-Hour Mess Age) – 4:43
"He Got Game" (C. Ridenhour, L. Leap, S. Stills) (from He Got Game) 4:45

Vinyl version
A1. "Rebel Without a Pause" (from It Takes a Nation of Millions to Hold Us Back) – 4:18
A2. "Bring the Noise" (from It Takes a Nation of Millions to Hold Us Back) – 3:47
B1. "Don't Believe the Hype" (from It Takes a Nation of Millions to Hold Us Back) – 5:19
B2. "Night of the Living Baseheads" (from It Takes a Nation of Millions to Hold Us Back) – 3:14
C1. "Fight the Power" (from Fear of a Black Planet) – 4:36
C2. "911 Is a Joke" (from Fear of a Black Planet) – 3:17
D1. "Welcome to the Terrordome" (from Fear of a Black Planet) – 5:26
E1. "Brothers Gonna Work It Out" (from Fear of a Black Planet) – 5:08
E2. "Can't Do Nuttin' for Ya Man" (from Fear of a Black Planet) – 2:47
F1. "Can't Truss It" (from Apocalypse 91... The Enemy Strikes Black) – 4:52
G1. "Shut Em Down" (from Apocalypse 91... The Enemy Strikes Black) – 4:19
G2. "Shut Em Down" [Pete Rock Mixx] (from Apocalypse 91... The Enemy Strikes Black)
H1. "Nighttrain" (from Apocalypse 91... The Enemy Strikes Black)
I1. "Give It Up" (from Muse Sick-N-Hour Mess Age) – 4:43
I2. "So Watcha Gonna Do Now" (from Muse Sick-N-Hour Mess Age)
J1. "He Got Game" (from He Got Game) – 4:45

References

2005 greatest hits albums
Public Enemy (band) albums